Mohamed Alhadi Albasheer Saeid (born 12 April 1999) is a Libyan footballer who currently plays as a defender for Métlaoui.

Career statistics

Club

Notes

References

1999 births
Living people
Libyan footballers
Libyan expatriate footballers
Association football defenders
ES Métlaoui players
Expatriate footballers in Tunisia
Libyan expatriate sportspeople in Tunisia